Cuddle is an extended play by the American punk rock band Stikky. It was released on 7-inch vinyl in Switzerland only in August 1988 through Off the Disk Records.

The extended play was recorded, mixed, and engineered in 4 hours at Art of Ears Studios in San Francisco, California on May 29, 1988. Due to many fans in the United States requesting copies of Cuddle, the group re-released it through bassist Chris Dodge's label Slap a Ham Records in October 1988.

Track listing

Personnel
 Todd Wilder - drums, lead vocals
 Chris Wilder - guitar, vocals
 Chris Dodge - bass, vocals

Production
 Andy Ernst - producer
 Kevin Army - engineer, mixing
 John Golden - mastering
 Murray Bowles - photography

External links
 Cuddle at Discogs.com

1988 debut EPs
Stikky albums